René Diaz (St. Etienne, 1926) is a French journalist-illustrator who had worked at Le Progrès Lyon for 30 years. He did all the drawings of the trial of Klaus Barbie, "the butchest of Lyon", a nazi criminal.

Exhibitions
 Centre d’Histoire de la résistance et de la Déportation of Lyon
 Memorial of Yad Vashem in Jerusalem

Sources

 http://www1.yadvashem.org/about_yad/magazine/magazine_new/franch/events_barbie_main.html
 http://www.guysen.com/print.php?sid=5131
 http://www.fra.cityvox.fr/expositions-arts_lyon/des-croquis-pour-l-histoire-dessins-de-p_160019/Profil-Eve

French journalists
French illustrators
Living people
French male non-fiction writers
Year of birth missing (living people)